Hornaday is a surname. Notable people with the surname include:

 Jeffrey Hornaday, American choreographer and film director
 Ron Hornaday Sr. (1931–2008), American racer 
 Ron Hornaday Jr. (born 1958), NASCAR Camping World Truck Series driver
 Ronnie Hornaday, American racer
 William Hornaday, American minister 
 William Temple Hornaday, American zoologist

See also
Hornaday River, a river in Canada